Hosoyamada (written: 細山田) is a Japanese surname. Notable people with the surname include:

, Japanese ice hockey player
, Japanese baseball player

Japanese-language surnames